Fort Plain Conservation Area is an archaeological site located at Fort Plain in Montgomery County, New York.

It was listed on the National Register of Historic Places in 1979.

References

Archaeological sites on the National Register of Historic Places in New York (state)
Geography of Montgomery County, New York
Historic districts on the National Register of Historic Places in New York (state)
National Register of Historic Places in Montgomery County, New York